Dieter Appelt (born 3 March 1935 in Niemegk) is a German photographer, painter, sculptor and video artist.

He studied music from 1954 to 1958 in the Mendelssohn Bartholdy Akademie in Leipzig. There, he discovers and develops a strong interest for Impressionism, Fauvism, and Russian constructivism. In 1959, he left East Germany and settled in West Berlin to study in the music school of Berlin until 1964. That same year, he decided to study fine art and he takes his first steps in painting, photography, etching, and sculpture. In the 1970s, he debuted on the public stage, with his first exhibition at the Deutsche Oper Berlin in 1974. In 1976 he focused in on visual arts and his career as an artist takes off. Appelt is also known for his works on the mechanics and techniques of photography that he made in the 1980s. In 1990 and 1999, he took part in the Venice Biennale. During this decade, Dieter Appelt exhibited in several major capitals of the world including: Tokyo, New-York, Berlin, Moscow, Budapest, Montreal, and Edinburgh. He lives and works in Berlin.

References

External links

Group exhibition "Notation". Akademie der Künste Berlin, and ZKM | Center for Art and Media Karlsruhe

1935 births
Living people
20th-century German painters
21st-century German painters
20th-century German sculptors
20th-century German male artists
21st-century German sculptors
21st-century German male artists
Photographers from Brandenburg
Members of the Academy of Arts, Berlin
People from Potsdam-Mittelmark